This is a list of Xbox One games currently planned or released either at retail or via download.

List

There are currently  games on both parts of this list.

Free-to-play

See also
 List of Xbox One games (M–Z)
 List of best-selling Xbox One video games
 List of Xbox games compatible with Xbox One
 List of Xbox 360 games compatible with Xbox One
 List of Xbox One X enhanced games
 List of Xbox One applications
 List of Xbox Play Anywhere games
 List of Xbox Live games on Windows 10

Notes

References 

Xbox One